Scylacosauria is a clade of therocephalian therapsids. It includes the basal family Scylacosauridae and the infraorder Eutherocephalia. Scylacosauridae and Eutherocephalia form this clade to the exclusion of Lycosuchidae, the most basal therocephalian family. Thus, Scylacosauria includes all therocephalians except lycosuchids. Below is a cladogram showing the phylogenetic position of Sylacosauria:

References

Therocephalia
Guadalupian first appearances
Middle Triassic extinctions
Tetrapod unranked clades